Senator Stranahan may refer to:

Farrand Stewart Stranahan (1842–1904), Vermont State Senate
Farrand Stranahan (1778–1826), New York State Senate
Nevada N. Stranahan (1861–1928), New York State Senate